Carmina Burana may refer to:

Carmina Burana, a medieval collection of poetry
Carmina Burana (Orff), a 1935-1936 musical composition by Carl Orff based on some of the poems
Carmina Burana (Ray Manzarek album), a recording of the Orff piece